Kernera is a monotypic genus of flowering plants belonging to the family Brassicaceae. It only contains one species, 'Kernera saxatilis' (L.) Sweet 

Its native range is eastern central and southern Europe. It is found in the countries of Albania, Austria, Bulgaria, Corsica, Czechoslovakia, France, Germany, Greece, Italy, Poland, Romania, Spain, Switzerland and Yugoslavia.

The genus name of Kernera is in honour of Johann Simon von Kerner (1755–1830), a German botanist and botanical illustrator, notable for his illustrations in Hortus sempervirens. The genus was first described and published in Pfl.-Gatt. on page 71 in 1792.

The species of Kernera saxatilis 7 known synonyms; Alyssum rupestre , Camelina saxatilis , Cochlearia saxatilis , Crucifera kernera , Gonyclisia saxatilis , Myagrum saxatile  and Nasturtium saxatile .
The Latin specific epithet of saxatilis means rock-dwelling and is derived from the Latin word 'saxum'. The species was first described and published in Hort. Brit. on page 467 in 1826.

It also has a subspecies ; Kernera saxatilis subsp. boissieri , which is native to Spain. It was first published in Consp. Fl. Eur. on page 51 in 1878.

References

Brassicaceae
Brassicaceae genera
Plants described in 1792
Flora of Southeastern Europe
Flora of Central Europe